Traffic Signal is a 2007 Indian Hindi-language social drama film co written, co produced and directed by Madhur Bhandarkar, starring Kunal Khemu, Neetu Chandra, Ranvir Shorey and Konkona Sen Sharma in the lead. Produced by Baldev and Kavita Pushkarna, and written by Sachin Yardi, it was released on 2 February 2007. Bhandarkar won National Film Awards in 2007 as Best Director for this film, and Anil Moti Ram Palande, the first National Film Award for Best Make-up Artist.

Plot 
This film is about the lives and travails of people living around a fictitious traffic signal in Mumbai. Anybody who drives in Mumbai has experienced the 2-odd minute wait at a traffic signal.

The traffic signal includes a microcosm of people who derive their daily livelihoods from it. There are beggars (kids and adults), prostitutes, tricksters, eunuchs and others who sell clothes, flowers and trinkets. They speak quickly, act fast and operate somewhat honourably (with each other) to eke a meager living out of the harsh Mumbai street life. They owe allegiance and hafta (weekly "protection" fee) to the signal manager, Silsila (Kunal Khemu).

Silsila grew up at the signal. He ran various trades there before he became the manager. He is an ideal manager: sensitive and caring of his workers yet ruthless when it comes to delivery. Silsila reports into a mid-level don, Jaffar, who in turn reports to the big boss Haji bhaijaan.

Life is well at the signal. A gentle girl, Rani (Neetu Chandra), arrives at the signal to sell ethnic clothes. The initial fireworks blossom into deeper companionship with Silsila. Everything proceeds normally.

Unbeknownst to Silsila, Haji bhaijaan is part of a larger nexus of evil that comprises politicians and the larger Mafia. Haji must play a dangerous game where he is forced to invoke the unwitting pawn, Silsila, to start a series of events that could ultimately destroy the traffic signal. Silsila is unaware of the larger consequences as he carries out his orders without question. But reality dawns on him when he is apprehended in a case of murder, extortion and bribery where he was hardly aware of things.

The signal faces destruction. Silsila's world, and all the people who grew up with it, face extinction. Silsila is forced to make a choice between his life and his world. As his life moves from Green to Red, he may only hope that the signal moves from Red to Green.

Cast 
 Kunal Khemu as Silsila
 Neetu Chandra as Rani
 Ranvir Shorey as Dominic
 Konkona Sen Sharma as Noorie
 Vinay Apte as Inspector Zahid Sheikh
 Upendra Limaye as Mangaya
 Sudhir Mishra as Haji Bhaijaan
 Gopal K Singh as Samari
 Kapil Rajput as Vishal Ahuja
 Madhu Sharma as Businessman's Wife
 D. Santosh as Jaffar Bhaai
 Manoj Joshi as Chief Engineer Sailesh Jha
 Sandeep Kulkarni

Soundtrack
"Aai Ga" - Vaishali Samant, Bhavika
"Aai Ga (Remix)" - Vaishali Samant, Bhavika
"Albela Saajan" - Kailash Kher
"Dilruba" - Kailash Kher
"Din Kuch Aise Guzarta Hai" - Jagjit Singh
"Haath Chhute Bhi To Rishtey Nahi Chhuta Karte" - Jagkit Singh
"Na Jis Din Teri Meri Baat Hoti Hai" - Bhupinder Singh
"Na Jis Din Teri Meri Baat Hoti Hai (Duet)" - Kunal Ganjawala, Yogita Pathak
"Piya Basanti" - Ustad Sultan Khan, K. S. Chitra
"Signal Pe" - Baba Sehgal, Vinod Rathod, Neerja Pandit, Raj Pandit, Navin Prabhakar
"Tere Bin Nahin Lagda" - Nusrat Fateh Ali Khan
"The Spirit Of Signal" - Raju Singh
"Yeh Zindagi Hai To Kya Zindagi Hai" - Hariharan, Sangeet Haldipur

Awards 
 2007: National Film Award for Best Direction for Madhur Bhandarkar
 2007: Best Make-up Artist for Anil Moti Ram Palande

Reception
This film is the last part of Madhur Bhandarkar's trilogy after Page 3 (2005) and Corporate (2006). Konkona Sen Sharma's acting is critically acclaimed and she got very good reviews for her role. Reviews state that Konkona Sen Sharma is able to bring a shred of credibility to her part.

References

External links
 Official website
 
 Traffic Signal at Indiafm.com
 Watch Traffic Signal at IndianMoviesList.com

2000s Hindi-language films
2007 films
Films set in Mumbai
Films about organised crime in India
Films scored by Shamir Tandon
Films scored by Sangeet Haldipur
Films scored by Kailash Kher
Films scored by Jagjit Singh
Films scored by Raju Singh
Films whose director won the Best Director National Film Award
Films about poverty in India
Films directed by Madhur Bhandarkar
Films that won the National Film Award for Best Make-up